is a vertically scrolling shooter released in by Taito in Japanese arcades in 1986. It was published by Romstar in North America as Tokio.

Gameplay
In the game, the player controls a red propeller-driven airplane, flying over the city of Tokyo. They are able to shoot and capture other red, smaller planes, which then will follow the player in formation. The player can choose between 3 formations: the first is able to shoot both air-to-air and air-to-ground projectiles, the second only air-to-air (but on a larger area), the third only air-to-ground (but on a larger area as well). During gameplay, the player should react accordingly to the threats and quickly decide which one of the 3 formation types is more adequate at one given moment.

The game is divided in areas, depicting key places in Tokyo, such as Shinjuku, Akasaka, and Ginza. There are no clearly defined "levels", but at some points the player is faced by a giant mothership, which can be shot down by hitting its engines.

Ports
A port was released for the MSX2 home computer in 1987.

Reception 
In Japan, Game Machine listed Tokio on their May 15, 1986 issue as being the most-successful table arcade unit of the month.

References

1986 video games
Arcade video games
MSX2 games
Vertically scrolling shooters
Romstar games
Taito arcade games
Video games developed in Japan